Shahnabad (also Romanized as Shahnābād, Shāhanābād, and Shahīnābād) is a village in Mirbag-e Shomali Rural District, in the Central District of Delfan County, Lorestan Province, Iran. At the 2006 census, its population was 1,385, in 286 families.

References 

Towns and villages in Delfan County